The chestnut-bellied spiny rat (Maxomys ochraceiventer) is a species of rodent in the family Muridae.
It is found in Indonesia and Malaysia.

References

Maxomys
Rodents of Indonesia
Rodents of Malaysia
Mammals described in 1894
Taxa named by Oldfield Thomas
Taxonomy articles created by Polbot